The 2005-06 Premier Reserve League season was the seventh since its establishment, and the last to feature more than 20 teams. The Northern League was won by Manchester United Reserves, while the Southern League was won by Tottenham Hotspur Reserves.

League table

Reserve League North

Reserve League South

Pld = Matches played; W = Matches won; D = Matches drawn; L = Matches lost; F = Goals for; A = Goals against; GD = Goal difference; Pts = Points

North/South Play-off Shield
The North/South play-off was won by Manchester United Reserves, who beat Tottenham Hotspur Reserves 2–0 at Old Trafford on 4 May 2006.

See also
2005-06 in English football
FA Premier League 2005-06

External links
Official Premier League site

Premier Reserve League
Res
Reserve